Farida Khelfa (born May 23, 1960) is a French documentary filmmaker and former model.

Early life
Khelfa was born in Lyon, one of eight children born to Algerian immigrants. She ran away from her strict Muslim family at the age of 15, joining her sister in Paris. There she befriended Christian Louboutin, who gave her a place to stay.

Career
While working at a nightclub, Khelfa was discovered by photographer Jean-Paul Goude. Goude was the first to use Khelfa as a model and later introduced her to designer Azzedine Alaïa.

In 2013 Khelfa was appointed as the brand ambassador for Schiaparelli. Khelfa parted with the brand in 2017 stating that she needed time to focus on her own projects including filmmaking. However Khelfa continued to work with the brand, notably appearing on the Schiaparelli spring/summer 2020 Haute Couture runway in 2019.

Personal life
At 20 Khelfa was involved romantically with photographer Jean-Paul Goude.

Khelfa married Henri Seydoux in 2012. The couple had been together since 1989 and already had two sons, Ismaël Seydoux and Omer Seydoux, at the time of their marriage. Through her marriage Khelfa is the step-mother of stylist Camille Seydoux and actress Léa Seydoux, her husband's children from his first marriage to Valérie Schlumberger.

Khelfa is a friend of former model Carla Bruni and was a witness at her 2008 wedding to French president Nicolas Sarkozy.

References

French female models
1960 births
Living people
French documentary filmmakers
Algerian documentary filmmakers
French people of Algerian descent
Algerian female models
Mass media people from Lyon